River of Time may refer to:

 River of Time (The Judds album) (1989), or the title track
 River of Time (Jorma Kaukonen album) (2009), or the title track
 River of Time (Michael Martin Murphey album) (1988), or the title track
 The River of Time, a 1986 story collection by David Brin
 "River of Time" (Legends of Tomorrow), an episode of Legends of Tomorrow
 River of Time: A Memoir of Vietnam, a book by Jon Swain

See also 
 Rivers of Time, a 1993 collection of short stories by L. Sprague de Camp